Martina Falke (born 21 July 1951 in Zeitz) is a former East German slalom canoeist who competed in the 1970s. She won two bronze medals at the 1973 ICF Canoe Slalom World Championships in Muotathal, earning them in the K-1 event and the K-1 team event.

Falke also finished tenth in the K-1 event at the 1972 Summer Olympics in Munich.

References

Sports-reference.com profile

1951 births
Canoeists at the 1972 Summer Olympics
East German female canoeists
Living people
Olympic canoeists of East Germany
Medalists at the ICF Canoe Slalom World Championships
People from Zeitz
Sportspeople from Saxony-Anhalt